The Philip Morris Korea Cup 1998 was the tenth competition of the Korean League Cup, and one of two Korean League Cups held in 1998.

Table

Matches

Awards

Source:

See also
1998 in South Korean football
1998 Korean League Cup
1998 K League
1998 Korean FA Cup

References

External links

1998 Supplementary
1998 domestic association football cups
1998 in South Korean football